Melvaig  is a remote village on the coast of western Ross-shire, Scottish Highlands and is in the Scottish council area of Highland. It is a cliff top village in Wester Ross dating back to Viking days. The village is accessed from Gairloch, which is 10 miles to the southeast.

It adjoins Aultgrishan, and the crofting village of North Erradale lies 4 miles to the south, along the coast road, with the village of Big Sand lying directly south. Melvaig is the final village at the north of the peninsular leading to Rua Reidh Lighthouse.

The Gaelic word for Melvaig is Mealabhaig meaning 'bent grass bay' probably derived from the Norse. As the township sits in cliff top position facing the Atlantic this is an apt name.

In 1805, John M'Callum crashed his schooner full of herrings into the rocks a distance of one mile from the shores of Melvaig.  All hands on deck perished save one.  A Melvaig resident named John Smith stole the sea boots off of one of the bodies washed along the shore.  A box containing 400 pounds was lost during the shipwreck and recovered by a resident, never to be returned.

By 1895, a boat slip was constructed by the government in the wrong location, this rendered the Dock useless for the local fishermen and had to be altered in later years after a parliamentary inquiry.

Melvaig has a long history of smuggling goods, with the many caves along the shoreline hidden by the diversion of streams which create waterfalls blocking view of the cavity.  Both the production and smuggling of alcohol was an important part of life for many residents, with many tactics of subterfuge.

References

Populated places in Ross and Cromarty